"Reach It" is a song by South African singer and record producer Zonke. It was released as one of the lead singles from her 2015 studio album Work of Heart.

Live performances
During the 2016 Africa Magic Viewers Choice Awards, Zonke performed a live rendition of "Reach It" along with another single titled "S.O.S (Release Me)".

Release history

Accolades

References

External links

2015 songs
Zonke songs